The Rabekke Formation is a geological formation dating to the latest Jurassic or earliest Cretaceous, around 146 to 145 million years ago. The formation crops out on the island of Bornholm, Denmark. Vertebrate fossils have been found in the formation.

Fossil content

Dinosaurs 
Small dromaeosaurid and indeterminate maniraptoran teeth have been uncovered in this formation. Sauropod tracks have also been found.

Mammals

Crocodylomorphs

Birds 
Small possible bird teeth have been identified in this formation.

Turtles 
Unidentified turtle carapaces have been recovered from the formation.

Fish 
Scales and jawbones of actinopterygian have been uncovered.

Amphibians 
Postcranial elements of amphibians have been identified.

Lizards 
Postcranial remains from lizards have been recovered.

See also 
 List of dinosaur-bearing rock formations
 List of fossiliferous stratigraphic units in Denmark

References

Further reading 
 F. Surlyk, J. Milàn, and N. Noe-Nygaard. 2008. Dinosaur tracks and possible lungfish aestivation burrows in a shallow coastal lake; lowermost Cretaceous, Bornholm, Denmark. Palaeogeography, Palaeoclimatology, Palaeoecology 267:292-304
 J. Lindgren, J. Rees, M. Siverson and G. Cuny. 2004. The first Mesozoic mammal from Scandinavia. GFF 126:325-330
 E. B. Koppelhus and D. J. Batten. 1992. Megaspore assemblages from the Jurassic and lowermost Cretaceous of Bornholm, Denmark. DGU, Danmarks Geologiske Undersogelse, Serie A 32:1-81

Geologic formations of Denmark
Lower Cretaceous Series of Europe
Cretaceous Denmark
Jurassic System of Europe
Jurassic Denmark
Berriasian Stage
Tithonian Stage
Mudstone formations
Siltstone formations
Shale formations
Lacustrine deposits
Ichnofossiliferous formations
Paleontology in Denmark
Formations